John Charles Hagee (born April 12, 1940) is an American pastor and televangelist. He is the founder of John Hagee Ministries, his ministry which telecast to the United States and Canada. Hagee is also the founder and chairman of the Christian-Zionist organization Christians United for Israel. Hagee is active politically and is known for his activism regarding the State of Israel. He has also attracted controversy over his comments on the Catholic Church, Jewish people and Islam, and promotion of the blood moon prophecy.

Career 

Hagee founded a series of churches in San Antonio, Texas starting in 1966, and each church outgrew its previous building, leading to him forming the Cornerstone Church in 1987. Beginning in 1981 in San Antonio, following Operation Opera, Hagee has organized "A Night to Honor Israel" events aiming to show support for the State of Israel.

Hagee has been politically active.  In 1968, he endorsed George Wallace in his bid for president.  His advocacy included organizing and mobilizing a youth movement called "Wallace Youth".

In 1996, Hagee spoke on behalf of Republican presidential primary candidate Alan Keyes, who in 2004 lost the U.S. Senate election in Illinois to Barack Obama. In 2002, Hagee endorsed the conservative State Representative John Shields in the latter's unsuccessful bid for the Republican primary for the District 25 seat in the Texas Senate. Hagee dubbed Shields's opponent, incumbent Jeff Wentworth, "the most pro-abortion" of 181 legislators in both houses of the Texas legislature.

On February 7, 2006, Hagee and some 400 leaders from across the Christian and Jewish communities formed Christians United for Israel (CUFI). This lobbies members of the United States Congress, using a biblical stance for promoting Christian Zionism. Around that time he received death threats for his activism on behalf of the State of Israel and hired bodyguards for protection.

In 2008, Hagee endorsed Senator John McCain in the presidential contest against Barack Obama. After Hagee's endorsement of McCain, a furore arose over statements made by Hagee that were perceived by some as anti-Catholic and antisemitic Following Hagee's remarks, McCain publicly distanced himself from Hagee.

Hagee was the primary funding source for the Israeli Zionist group Im Tirtzu, until he cut ties with the organization in 2013.

In 2016, Hagee endorsed Donald Trump in the 2016 presidential election.

Views

Hagee has stated that he believes the Bible commands Christians to support the State of Israel.

In 2007, Hagee stated that he does not believe in global warming, and he also said that he sees the Kyoto Protocol as a "conspiracy" aimed at manipulating the U.S. economy.

Hagee is anti-abortion and stopped giving money to Israel's Hadassah Medical Center when it began offering the procedure.

Hagee has been criticized for statements pertaining to Jews, the Catholic Church, and Islam. Some Jewish leaders, such as Reform Rabbi Eric Yoffie have criticized Hagee for being "extremist" on Israeli policy and for disparaging other faiths.

Catholicism 
Hagee purported that Adolf Hitler's antisemitism was especially derived from his Catholic background, and he also purported that Hitler was "a spiritual leader in the Catholic Church," as well as purporting that the Catholic Church under Pope Pius XII encouraged Nazism. Hagee also blamed the Catholic Church for instigating the Dark Ages, claiming that it allowed the Crusaders to rape and murder with impunity. William Donohue, the president of the Catholic League for Civil and Religious Rights, rejected the comments and Hagee's explanations for them. On May 12, 2008, after discussions with Donohue and other Catholic leaders, Hagee issued a letter of apology, expressing regret for "any comments that Catholics have found hurtful." The apology was accepted by William Donohue.

Jewish people 
Hagee has claimed that Adolf Hitler was born from a lineage of "accursed, genocidally murderous half-breed Jews". Citing material from Jewish tradition, he claimed that the persecution of Jews throughout history, implicitly including the Holocaust, was due to the Jewish people's disobedience of God.

In 2008, Hagee claimed that the anti-Christ will be "a homosexual" and "partially Jewish, as was Adolph [sic] Hitler" and he also claimed that a reference in Jeremiah 16:16 to "fishers" and "hunters" was symbolic of positive motivation (Herzl/Zionism) and negative motivation (Hitler/Nazism) respectively, both men were sent by God for the purpose of having Jews return to Israel, and he suggested that the Holocaust was willed by God because most Jews "ignored" Herzl.

Islam 
Hagee has been described as making slanderous or demonizing comments about Islam. Hagee has claimed that "Islam not only condones violence; it commands it". He has also claimed that a contrast exists between Islam's "violent nature" and Christianity's "loving nature" and that the Quran teaches, and Muslims have a mandate, to kill Jews and Christians.

Blood moon prophecy 
Hagee, along with Mark Biltz, created the blood moon prophecy, which they promoted in a 2013 book. The two men claimed that a tetrad which began with the April 2014 lunar eclipse was a sign of the end times as described in the Bible and the tetrad ended with the lunar eclipse on September 27–28, 2015. Hagee and Biltz's claims gained media attention. The prediction was criticized by scientists and other Christians.

See also
 Israel lobby in the United States
 Pat Robertson
 Christian Zionism

References

External links 

 John Hagee Ministries - official website
 Christians United for Israel - official website
 Cornerstone Church - official website

1940 births
Living people
20th-century American male writers
20th-century American non-fiction writers
20th-century apocalypticists
20th-century evangelicals
21st-century American male writers
21st-century American non-fiction writers
21st-century apocalypticists
21st-century evangelicals
American anti-abortion activists
American Charismatics
American Christian Zionists
American conspiracy theorists
American critics of Islam
American evangelicals
American male non-fiction writers
American Pentecostal pastors
American television evangelists
Christian conspiracy theorists
Christian creationists
Christian fundamentalists
Critics of atheism
Critics of the Catholic Church
Christian critics of Islam
Intelligent design advocates
Male critics of feminism
Pentecostals from Texas
Pentecostal theologians
Pentecostal writers
People from Baytown, Texas
People from San Antonio
Texas Republicans